The Guns N' Roses/Metallica Stadium Tour was a co-headlining concert tour by American rock bands Guns N' Roses and Metallica during 1992. It took place in the middle of Guns N' Roses' Use Your Illusion Tour, promoting their Use Your Illusion I and II albums, and between Metallica's Wherever We May Roam Tour and  Nowhere Else to Roam, promoting their eponymous fifth album Metallica. The tour's opening act was Faith No More. Axl Rose had wanted Seattle rock band Nirvana to be the opening act, but frontman Kurt Cobain refused.

History
"When you have to get Guns N' Roses and Metallica on the same tour to sell tickets," Ronnie James Dio told WERS' Nasty Habits show, "it shows everyone that you have to put real big packaging together to make a difference."

On May 12, 1992, Metallica's drummer, Lars Ulrich, and Guns N' Roses' lead guitarist, Slash, held a press conference at the Gaslight in Los Angeles, California, to announce that both Metallica and Guns N' Roses would tour together that summer, starting in Washington, D.C., at RFK Stadium on July 17, 1992, where Metallica's opening song "Creeping Death" was recorded for their documentary A Year and a Half in the Life of Metallica.

On July 21, 1992, when Guns N' Roses was performing at the Pontiac Silverdome in Pontiac, Michigan, when the band was done performing their song "You Could Be Mine", Axl Rose vomited onstage and left soon afterwards, but returned to the stage and apologized to the audience for the poor performance, so the band performed the song again.

Blind Melon's lead vocalist, Shannon Hoon, joined Guns N' Roses onstage for the original version of their song "Don't Cry", on July 22, 1992, at the Hoosier Dome in Indianapolis, Indiana.

On July 29, 1992, while Guns N' Roses was playing during the second show at Giants Stadium in East Rutherford, New Jersey, Guns N' Roses frontman Axl Rose encountered severe pain in his throat, but he continued the show until he was hit in the genitals by a cigarette lighter thrown from the audience during "Knockin' on Heaven's Door", so Rose retreated backstage to regain his energy, while bassist Duff McKagan took over on vocals and then the show ended.

On July 30, 1992, while on break in New York City, Rose was diagnosed with severe damage to his vocal chords, and was told by doctors that he could not sing for at least a week, so three shows of the tour were rescheduled.

The most infamous event during the tour took place during a show on August 8, 1992, at Montreal's Olympic Stadium. Metallica frontman James Hetfield suffered second and third degree burns to the left half of his body, both arms and left hand after standing in the way of a pyrotechnics reaction during the opening of "Fade to Black". Hetfield himself has said "There were extra pyro in addition to the original pyro and I got too close the original pyro." Metallica had to prematurely end their performance, but promised to return to the city for another show. After a lengthy delay, during which the audience became increasingly upset and restless, Guns N' Roses took the stage. However, the shortened time between sets did not allow for adequate tuning of stage monitors, resulting in musicians not being able to hear themselves. In addition, Rose claimed that his throat was hurt, causing the band to prematurely leave the stage themselves. The early departure led to a riot by audience members, reminiscent of the rioting that had occurred during a Guns N' Roses show near St. Louis, Missouri, one year earlier. The aggrieved audience members took to the streets of Montreal, overturning cars, smashing windows, looting local stores, and setting fires. Local authorities were barely able to bring the riot under control. Footage from the debacle was later included in the 1992 documentary A Year and a Half in the Life of Metallica.

Six of the shows on the tour had to be rescheduled because of Hetfield's injury, and a show in Vancouver that was going to be held on August 17, 1992 at the British Columbia Place Stadium was cancelled.

The tour resumed in Phoenix, Arizona, at the Phoenix International Raceway on August 25, 1992, with Hetfield wearing a thick elbow-to-finger bandage and unable to play guitar until his arm was fully healed. Former Metallica roadie, former Metallica guitar tech, and Metal Church guitarist John Marshall filled in for the rest of the tour on rhythm guitar, while Hetfield continued to sing. Metallica's performance of "Nothing Else Matters" during their performance in Avondale was recorded for their documentary A Year and a Half in the Life of Metallica.

Faith No More lead guitarist Jim Martin joined Metallica onstage for their cover of the Misfits song "Last Caress" on September 5, 1992, at Texas Stadium in Irving, Texas.

Faith No More left the tour on September 21, 1992, to fulfill prior touring commitments, so Body Count opened up the tour, starting in Kansas City, Missouri, at Arrowhead Stadium on September 17, 1992, and continued opening for the rest of the tour, along with Motörhead on the last three dates of the tour. Motörhead opened for the show at the Los Angeles Coliseum in Los Angeles, California, on September 27, 1992, as Body Count was dropped from the bill for the Coliseum show.

Comedian Andrew Dice Clay opened for Guns N' Roses and introduced the band when they came onstage on October 3, 1992 at the Rose Bowl Stadium in Pasadena, California.

The tour was a big financial success for Metallica, but Guns N' Roses did not make as much. According to Slash, in his self-titled autobiography, the band lost about 80% of their earnings primarily due to Rose being extravagant in his spending, which included him funding expensive backstage theme parties at every show, as well as the band being fined heavily for their many late appearances. The tour also earned both bands a Metal Edge Readers' Choice Award in 1992, when it was voted "Best Concert Tour".

Guns N' Roses setlists

First setlist
(Taken from the Orchard Park, New York, Rich Stadium show on July 25, 1992)

 "Nightrain"
 "Mr. Brownstone"
 "Live and Let Die" (Paul McCartney and Wings cover)
 "Attitude"  (Misfits cover)
 "Bad Obsession"
 "Double Talkin' Jive"
 "Civil War"
 "Wild Horses" (The Rolling Stones cover)
 "Patience"
 "It's So Easy"
 "Welcome to the Jungle"
 "You Could Be Mine"
 "It's Alright" (Black Sabbath cover)
 "November Rain"
 "Sweet Child o' Mine"
 "Knockin' on Heaven's Door" (Bob Dylan cover)
 "Don't Cry (Original)" 
 "Paradise City"

Second setlist
(Taken from the Pittsburgh, Pennsylvania, Three Rivers Stadium show on July 26, 1992)

 "It's So Easy"
 "Nightrain"
 "Mr. Brownstone"
 "Live and Let Die" (Paul McCartney and Wings cover)
 "Attitude" (Misfits cover)
 "Bad Obsession"
 "Double Talkin' Jive"
 "Civil War"
 "Move to the City"
 "Wild Horses" (The Rolling Stones cover)
 "Patience"
 "Welcome to the Jungle"
 "You Could Be Mine"
 "November Rain"
 "Sweet Child o' Mine"
 "Knockin' on Heaven's Door" (Bob Dylan cover)
 "Don't Cry (Original)" 
 "Paradise City"

Third setlist
(Taken from the Houston, Texas, Astrodome show on September 4, 1992)

 "Welcome to the Jungle"
 "Mr. Brownstone"
 "Live and Let Die" (Paul McCartney and Wings cover)
 "Attitude" (Misfits cover)
 "Nightrain"
 "Bad Obsession"
 "It's So Easy"
 "Wild Horses" (The Rolling Stones cover)
 "Patience"
 "Double Talkin' Jive"
 "Civil War"
 "It's Alright" (Black Sabbath cover)
 "November Rain"
 "You Could Be Mine"
 "Sweet Child o' Mine"
 "Knockin' on Heaven's Door" (Bob Dylan cover)
 "Don't Cry (Original)" 
 "Paradise City"

Fourth setlist
(Taken from the Columbia, South Carolina, Williams-Brice Stadium show on September 7, 1992)

 "Welcome to the Jungle"
 "Mr. Brownstone"
 "Live and Let Die" (Paul McCartney and Wings cover)
 "Attitude" (Misfits cover)
 "It's So Easy"
 "Bad Obsession"
 "Nightrain"
 "Double Talkin' Jive"
 "Civil War"
 "Move to the City"
 "Wild Horses" (The Rolling Stones cover)
 "Patience"
 "You Could Be Mine"
 "It's Alright" (Black Sabbath cover)
 "November Rain"
 "Sweet Child o' Mine"
 "Knockin' on Heaven's Door" (Bob Dylan cover)
 "Paradise City"

Fifth setlist
(Taken from the Foxborough, Massachusetts, Foxboro Stadium show on September 11, 1992)

 "Welcome to the Jungle"
 "Mr. Brownstone"
 "Live and Let Die" (Paul McCartney and Wings cover)
 "Attitude" (Misfits cover)
 "It's So Easy"
 "Double Talkin' Jive"
 "Civil War"
 "Wild Horses" (The Rolling Stones cover)
 "Patience"
 "Nightrain"
 "Out ta Get Me"
 "You Could Be Mine"
 "It's Alright" (Black Sabbath cover)
 "November Rain"
 "Sweet Child o' Mine"
 "Knockin' on Heaven's Door" (Bob Dylan cover)
 "Don't Cry (Original)" 
 "Paradise City"

Sixth setlist
(Taken from the San Diego, California, Jack Murphy Stadium show on September 30, 1992)

 "Welcome to the Jungle"
 "It's So Easy"
 "Mr. Brownstone"
 "Nightrain"
 "Attitude" (Misfits cover)
 "Live and Let Die" (Paul McCartney and Wings cover)
 "Bad Obsession"
 "Wild Horses" (The Rolling Stones cover)
 "Patience"
 "Double Talkin' Jive"
 "Civil War"
 "You Could Be Mine"
 "It's Alright" (Black Sabbath cover)
 "November Rain"
 "Sweet Child o' Mine"
 "Knockin' on Heaven's Door" (Bob Dylan cover)
 "Don't Cry (Original)" 
 "Paradise City"

Metallica setlists

First setlist
(Taken from the Orchard Park, New York, Rich Stadium show on July 25, 1992)

 "Creeping Death"
 "Harvester of Sorrow"
 "Fade to Black"
 "Sad but True"
 "Wherever I May Roam"
 "Of Wolf and Man"
 "For Whom the Bell Tolls"
 "The Unforgiven"
 "The Shortest Straw"
 "Bass Solo"
 "Guitar Solo"
 "Welcome Home (Sanitarium)"
 "Master of Puppets"
 "Seek & Destroy"
 "Whiplash"
 "Nothing Else Matters"
 "Am I Evil?" (Diamond Head cover)
 "Last Caress" (Misfits cover)
 "One"
 "Enter Sandman"

Second setlist
(Taken from the Pittsburgh, Pennsylvania, Three Rivers Stadium show on July 26, 1992)

 "Creeping Death"
 "Harvester of Sorrow"
 "Fade to Black"
 "Sad but True"
 "Wherever I May Roam"
 "Of Wolf and Man"
 "For Whom the Bell Tolls"
 "The Unforgiven"
 "The Shortest Straw"
 "Bass Solo"
 "Guitar Solo"
 "Welcome Home (Sanitarium)"
 "Master of Puppets"
 "Seek & Destroy"
 "Whiplash"
 "Nothing Else Matters"
 "Am I Evil?" (Diamond Head cover)
 "Last Caress" (Misfits cover)
 "One"
 "Enter Sandman"

Third setlist
(Taken from the Houston, Texas, Astrodome show on September 4, 1992)

 "Creeping Death"
 "Harvester of Sorrow"
 "Welcome Home (Sanitarium)"
 "Sad but True"
 "Wherever I May Roam"
 "Of Wolf and Man"
 "For Whom the Bell Tolls"
 "The Unforgiven"
 "The Shortest Straw"
 "Bass Solo"
 "Guitar Solo"
 "Fade to Black"
 "Master of Puppets"
 "Seek & Destroy"
 "Whiplash"
 "Nothing Else Matters"
 "Am I Evil?" (Diamond Head cover)
 "Last Caress" (Misfits cover)
 "One"
 "Enter Sandman"

Fourth setlist
(Taken from the Columbia, South Carolina, Williams-Brice Stadium show on September 7, 1992)

 "Creeping Death"
 "Harvester of Sorrow"
 "Welcome Home (Sanitarium)"
 "Sad but True"
 "Wherever I May Roam"
 "Of Wolf and Man"
 "For Whom the Bell Tolls"
 "The Unforgiven"
 "The Shortest Straw"
 "Bass Solo"
 "Guitar Solo"
 "Fade to Black"
 "Master of Puppets"
 "Seek & Destroy"
 "Whiplash"
 "Nothing Else Matters"
 "Am I Evil?" (Diamond Head cover)
 "Last Caress" (Misfits cover)
 "One"
 "Enter Sandman"

Fifth setlist
(Taken from the Foxborough, Massachusetts, Foxboro Stadium show on September 11, 1992)

 "Creeping Death"
 "Harvester of Sorrow"
 "Welcome Home (Sanitarium)"
 "Sad but True"
 "Wherever I May Roam"
 "Of Wolf and Man"
 "For Whom the Bell Tolls"
 "The Unforgiven"
 "The Shortest Straw"
 "Bass Solo"
 "Guitar Solo"
 "Fade to Black"
 "Master of Puppets"
 "Seek & Destroy"
 "Whiplash"
 "Nothing Else Matters"
 "Am I Evil?" (Diamond Head cover)
 "Last Caress" (Misfits cover)
 "One"
 "Enter Sandman"

Sixth setlist
(Taken from the San Diego, California, Jack Murphy Stadium show on September 30, 1992)

 "Creeping Death"
 "Harvester of Sorrow"
 "Welcome Home (Sanitarium)"
 "Sad but True"
 "Wherever I May Roam"
 "Of Wolf and Man"
 "For Whom the Bell Tolls"
 "The Unforgiven"
 "The Shortest Straw"
 "Bass Solo"
 "Guitar Solo"
 "Fade to Black"
 "Master of Puppets"
 "Seek & Destroy"
 "Whiplash"
 "Nothing Else Matters"
 "Am I Evil?" (Diamond Head cover)
 "Last Caress" (Misfits cover)
 "One"
 "Enter Sandman"

Tour dates

Personnel
Guns N' Roses
W. Axl Rose – lead vocals, piano, whistle, whistling, tambourine
Slash – lead guitar, backing vocals, talkbox
Duff McKagan – bass, backing vocals, lead vocals
Matt Sorum – drums, percussion, backing vocals
Dizzy Reed – keyboards, piano, organ, synthesizer, percussion, tambourine
Gilby Clarke – rhythm guitar, backing vocals
Metallica
 James Hetfield – lead vocals, rhythm guitar
 Kirk Hammett – lead guitar, backing vocals
 Lars Ulrich – drums, percussion
 Jason Newsted – bass, backing vocals
 John Marshall – rhythm guitar (August 25 – October 6)
Faith No More
Mike Patton – lead vocals
Jim Martin – lead guitar, backing vocals, rhythm guitar on "Last Caress" during Metallica's set
Billy Gould – bass, backing vocals
Mike Bordin – drums
Roddy Bottum – keyboards, backing vocals
Motörhead
Ian "Lemmy" Kilmister – lead vocals, bass
Phil "Wizzö" Campbell – lead guitar, backing vocals
Würzel – lead guitar
Mickey Dee – drums
Body Count
Ice-T – lead vocals
Ernie C – lead guitar
D-Roc the Executioner – rhythm guitar
Mooseman – bass
Beatmaster V – drums
Touring musicians for Guns N' Roses
Teddy Andreadis – keyboards, backing vocals, harmonica, tambourine
Roberta Freeman – backing vocals, tambourine
Traci Amos – backing vocals, tambourine
Diane Jones – backing vocals, tambourine
Anne King – trumpet
Cece Worrall-Rubin – saxophone
Lisa Maxwell – saxophone
Additional musicians for Guns N' Roses
Shannon Hoon – backing vocals on "Don't Cry" (Original) (July 22, 1992)

References

1992 concert tours
Co-headlining concert tours
Guns N' Roses concert tours
Metallica concert tours